Foley Glacier is a glacier about  long flowing north from the western end of Thurston Island just east of Cape Petersen. It was named by the Advisory Committee on Antarctic Names after Kevin M. Foley, of the United States Geological Survey, Reston, Virginia, a computer specialist and team member of the Glaciological and Coastal-Change Maps of Antarctica Project.

See also
 List of glaciers in the Antarctic
 Glaciology

Maps
 Thurston Island – Jones Mountains. 1:500000 Antarctica Sketch Map. US Geological Survey, 1967.
 Antarctic Digital Database (ADD). Scale 1:250000 topographic map of Antarctica. Scientific Committee on Antarctic Research (SCAR). Since 1993, regularly upgraded and updated.

References 

 

Glaciers of Thurston Island